John Lyles (September 16, 1911 – February 5, 1954), nicknamed "The Brute", was an American Negro league infielder between 1932 and 1943.

A native of Charleston, Missouri, Lyles made his Negro leagues debut in 1932 with the Indianapolis ABCs. He was selected to represent the Cleveland Bears in the 1939 East–West All-Star Game, and finished his career in 1943 with the Cleveland Buckeyes. Lyles died in St. Louis, Missouri in 1954 at age 42.

References

External links
 and Baseball-Reference Black Baseball stats and Seamheads

1911 births
1954 deaths
Cleveland Buckeyes players
Homestead Grays players
Indianapolis ABCs (1931–1933) players
Indianapolis ABCs (1938) players
St. Louis–New Orleans Stars players
20th-century African-American sportspeople
Baseball infielders